Jonas Griffith (born January 27, 1997) is an American football inside linebacker for the Denver Broncos of the National Football League (NFL). He played college football for the Indiana State Sycamores.

College career
Griffith spent four years at Indiana State where in 44 career games, registered 382 tackles (200 solo), 28.5 tackles for loss, 14.0 sacks, three interceptions, nine passes defensed, four forced fumbles and three fumble recoveries, finishing his career with six All-American honors, which tied for the most in program history.

Professional career

San Francisco 49ers
On April 25, 2020, Griffith was signed by the San Francisco 49ers as an undrafted free agent and was waived on August 20.

Indianapolis Colts
On October 7, 2020, Griffith was signed by the Indianapolis Colts to the practice squad and was released six days later.

San Francisco 49ers (second stint)
On October 21, 2020, the San Francisco 49ers signed Griffith to the practice squad, where he spent the rest of the season.

On January 4, 2021, the 49ers signed Griffith to a reserve/future contract. That preseason, he ranked third on the 49ers with nine defensive tackles while leading 49ers in special teams tackles and also having two passes defensed.

Denver Broncos
On August 31, 2021, Griffith was traded, alongside a 2022 seventh-round pick, to the Denver Broncos in exchange for a 2022 sixth-round pick and a 2023 seventh-round pick. He was placed on injured reserve on September 28, 2021. He was activated on October 30.  After an impressive showing, 13 appearances and 4 starts, during the 2021 season; Denver tendered Griffith an exclusive-rights free agent offer.

Griffith entered the 2022 season as a starting linebacker for the Broncos. He played in nine games before being placed on injured reserve on November 19, 2022.

Personal life
Griffith is a Christian. In college, he studied criminology and criminal justice.

References

External links
Indiana State Sycamores bio
Denver Broncos bio

1997 births
Living people
American football linebackers
Denver Broncos players
Indiana State Sycamores football players
Indianapolis Colts players
Players of American football from Louisville, Kentucky
San Francisco 49ers players